Gweni-Fada is a meteorite crater in Chad, Africa.

The Gweni Fada structure was first noted on the map NE 34 X Fada of the IGN (National Geographic Institute France)  and aerial photographs in the 1950s of IGN by Alain Beauvilain (Paris X- Nanterre University). In April 1995, at the initiative of CNAR  (National Center to Help Research of Chad) a team of French geologists (Pierre Vincent, University of Clermont-Ferrand, Alain and Najia Beauvilain, CNAR Chad) visited the site and reported evidence of shock metamorphism within rock samples they had collected inside the structure.

Centered at 17°25′N and 21°45′E, being slightly wider in the NW-SE direction (cf. topographic map), the asymmetric structure is deeply eroded. A broad depression (ø 12 km) forms a crescent around two thirds of the inner complex zone. On the northern side, an elevated outer ring of outward-dipping sandstones surrounds the depression. 
In its south, the external depression is absent. The inner zone (ø 10 km) consists of a rugged terrain with hills several hundred meters in height. The latter may be remnants of the central uplift (see topographic map).

The age is estimated to be less than 345 million years (Carboniferous). It is older than that of Aorounga because its coverage of impactite has disappeared as a result of erosion.

See also 
 List of impact craters in Africa
 Aorounga crater

References

Further reading 
 Koeberl, C., Reimold, W.U., Vincent, P. M., Brandt, D., Aorounga and Gweni Fada Impact Structures, Chad, Central Afr.: Petrology and Geochemistry of Target Rocks, LPSC XXIX, Lunar and Planetary Institute, Houston, TX, (CD-ROM). 1998
 Vincent P.M., Beauvilain, A., Découverte d'un nouveau cratère d'impact météoritique en Afrique: l'astroblème de Gweni-Fada (Ennedi, Sahara du Tchad) (in French). Comptes Rendus de l'Académie des Sciences, v. 323, pp. 987–997. 1996
 Vincent P.M., Beauvilain, A., The circular structure of Gweni-Fada, Ennedi: A second meteorite impact crater in Northern Chad? (abstract). 4th International Workshop of the ESF Scientific Network on "Impact Cratering and Evolution of Planet Earth". The Role of Impacts on the Evolution of the Atmosphere and Biosphere with Regard to Short- and Long-Term Changes, pp. 156–157. 1995
 Vincent, P. M., The circular structure of Gweni-Fada, Ennedi: A second meteorite impact crater in Northern Chad? (abstract). 4th International Workshop of the ESF Scientific Network on "Impact Cratering and Evolution of Planet Earth". The Role of Impacts on the Evolution of the Atmosphere and Biosphere with regard to Short- and Long-Term Changes, p. 156-157. 1995

External links 
 Description and exclusive pictures in the field by Alain Beauvilain

Impact craters of Chad
Carboniferous impact craters
Carboniferous Africa
Ennedi-Ouest Region